Vilnis is a Latvian masculine given name. Individuals bearing the name Vilnis include: 
Vilnis Edvīns Bresis (1938–2017) Latvian politician 
Vilnis Ezeriņš, Latvian-born American football player
Vilnis Straume (born 1937), Latvian footballer

Latvian masculine given names